The International P.E.A.C.E. Benefit Compilation, commonly referred to as the P.E.A.C.E. compilation, retitled in 1997 as P.E.A.C.E./War, by combining the legends on its front and back cover, for its reissue on CD, is a compilation double album first released in 1984 by R Radical Records, the label run by MDC frontman Dave Dictor, in association with San Francisco Bay Area punk fanzine Maximumrocknroll.  The "P.E.A.C.E." in the album title is a backronym for "Peace, Energy, Action, Cooperation, Evolution".

Overview
P.E.A.C.E. features 55 hardcore punk acts from around the world, including such stalwarts as Dead Kennedys, Crass, Subhumans, Butthole Surfers, and MDC themselves. 30 of the acts were from outside the United States, and all of the acts featured frequently wrote and recorded left-leaning topical music (with the lone exception of the Butthole Surfers, who came from a similar political position but did not normally deal with political issues in their music). Eight of the acts originated from Italy, which had been sprouting anarchist punk bands such as Cheetah Chrome and the Motherfuckers, Contrazione and RAF Punk (all represented on the album) for quite some time. The cover art was created by San Francisco artist Dana F. Smith.

Maximumrocknrolls main contribution to the project, other than assisting in recruiting acts to participate on the double album, was in the assemblage of a 72-page magazine-sized insert featuring several pages on the topics of nuclear disarmament, imperialism, radiation, pollution, and political demonstrations.

All of the profits from the album, according to a primitive obi strip-style insert shrunkwrapped to the original double vinyl release, were slated for various anti-nuclear groups and activities worldwide.

The CD reissue
In 1997, the indie label New Red Archives re-released the album as a double CD set under the title P.E.A.C.E./War, adding five tracks from artists on their roster to the end of disc two. The reissue does not include a reproduction of the first release's booklet, and, since its early name was changed, it is not known if the benefit aspect of the original album still holds.

 Re-release
Dave Dictor along with Grimace Records re-released this compilation in vinyl, CD, and digital format in 2020  
All online streaming revenues are being donated to Covid-19 relief, via a Mutual Aid strategy implemented by Anarchist Organization Mutual Aid Disaster Relief.

Track listings
In keeping with the original album's insert, the band's country of origin is given in parentheses.

1984 2-LP release

1997 2-CD edition

Personnel
Incomplete list.Articles of Faith (USA)Vic Bondi – vocals
Joe Scuderi – guitar
Dorian Tajbakhsh (aka Dorian Taj) – guitar
Dave Shield – bass
Bill Richman (pka Virus X) – drumsG.I.S.M. (Japan)Sakevi Yokoyama – vocals
Randy Uchida – guitar
Kannon "Cloudy" Masuo – bass
Tohru Hiroshima – drumsNeon Christ (USA)Randy DuTeau – vocals
William "Kip" DuVall – guitar
Danny Lankford – bass
Jimi (Jimmy Demer) – drumsKalashnikov (Denmark)Charlotte Bagge – vocals
IB! (Henrik Ib Jørgensen) – guitar
F.C. Physant – bass
Carsten West – drumsCause for Alarm (USA)Keith Burkhardt – vocals
Alex Kinon – guitar
Rob Kabula – bass
Robbie Cryptcrasher – drumsThe Proletariat (USA)Richard Brown – vocals
Frank Michaels – guitar
Peter Bevilacqua – bass, backing vocals
Tom McKnight – drumsConflict (UK)Colin Jerwood – vocals
Steve Gittins – guitar
Big John (born John Clifford) – bass
Francisco "Paco" Carreno – drumsProduction'''
Jon Smith – engineering (track A1)
Dan Levitin – production (A10, D14)
Neon Christ – co-production (A3)
Nick Jameson – co-production (A3), engineering (A3)
Dana F. Smith – artwork (front and back cover paintings)

Notes

References

Further reading
 Blush, Steven (2001). American Hardcore: A Tribal History''. Second ed., 2010. Feral House. . p. 401.

1984 compilation albums
Hardcore punk compilation albums
New Red Archives compilation albums
Political music albums